Tetrathemis polleni, the black-splashed elf is a species of dragonfly in the family Libellulidae.

Distribution and status
It is found in sub-Saharan Africa from South Africa to Somalia, Ethiopia and Gambia.

Habitat
This dragonfly is found at shaded pools, such as those found in gallery forest.

References

External links

 Tetrathemis polleni on African Dragonflies and Damselflies Online

Libellulidae
Taxonomy articles created by Polbot
Insects described in 1869